The Primetime Emmy Award for Outstanding Motion Design is an annual award given to recognize the best motion design work of the year. The award was introduced as a Primetime Emmy category at the 67th Primetime Creative Arts Emmy Awards in 2015. Winners are selected by a jury.

Winners

2010s

2020s

References

Motion Design